Csilla Mazák-Németh, née Németh, (born 21 January 1989 in Budapest) is a Hungarian handballer who plays for MTK Budapest in right back position.

Achievements

Nemzeti Bajnokság I:
Winner: 2007
Silver Medallist: 2009
Bronze Medallist: 2008, 2011
Magyar Kupa:
Silver Medallist: 2010
EHF Cup Winners' Cup:
Winner: 2011
Semifinalist: 2007

Personal life 
She is married, her husband is Martin Mazák, Slovak handball player. Their daughter, Emma was born in January 2019.

References

External links
 Csilla Németh career statistics at Worldhandball

1989 births
Living people
Handball players from Budapest
Hungarian female handball players
Siófok KC players
20th-century Hungarian women
21st-century Hungarian women